Wan Zack Haikal bin Wan Noor (born 28 January 1991) is a Malaysian professional footballer who plays as a striker or midfielder, for Perak FC in the Malaysia Super League. He is also a member of the Malaysia national team.

Club career

Kuala Lumpur President Cup Team
Wan Zack Haikal was born in Maran, Pahang. He attended a SMK Kuala Lanar, project school of Pahang FA at Kuala Lipis and later was chosen to join the Kuala Lumpur President Cup Team in 2005 at the age of 14. Even though the Kuala Lumpur President Cup Team did not manage to reach the finals, Wan Zack became the top scorer with 11 goals.

Felda United
After playing 2 years for the Kuala Lumpur President Cup Team, He was later scouted by former national team player, Reduan Abdullah and Reduan gave Wan Zack a one-year contract with the newly created Felda United in 2007 at the age of 17. He was the youngest player in the team and manage to score two goals in 6 appearances.

Harimau Muda
Wan Zack left Felda United FC in 2008 and joined Harimau Muda under Ong Kim Swee. Wan Zack was part of the Harimau Muda team that won the 2009 Premier League. During the 2010 season, Harimau Muda was split into two teams and Haikal was chosen to be in the A team. Wan Zack and 25 other Harimau Muda A players were chosen by Azraai Khor to participate in an 8-month long, training camp in Zlaté Moravce, Slovakia.

FC ViOn Zlaté Moravce (loan)
In September 2011, Slovakian club FC ViOn Zlaté Moravce have confirmed the signings of Wan Zack. He joins the club on loan for 3 months until 30 October from Harimau Muda. Struck by a 4-month injury during a national duty for the national Olympic team, Haikal failed to make an appearance during his loan, only appearing in 1 unofficially friendly match with Zlaté Moravce.

Return to Harimau Muda
After his loaned finished, he returned to his club, Harimau Muda which was then competing in S. League. Previously, the team was competing in the Malaysia Super League for the 2011 season.

FC Ryukyu
Malaysian media reported in early March 2012 that Wan Zack, along with teammate Wan Zaharulnizam Zakaria is to attend trial with Japan Football League side FC Ryukyu after impressing the Japanese side talent spotter during Malaysia's 2–0 defeat to Japan in the 2012 Olympic qualifiers match in Tosu. They successfully completed the 2-week trial with the Japanese club in July. In March 2013, Wan Zack was officially offered a two-year contract, but Wan Zaharulnizam did not. Instead, 19-year-old Nazirul Naim Che Hashim was offered a contract instead. Wan Zack and Nazirul officially signed a two-year playing contract with FC Ryukyu in early April 2013. Wan Zack made his full debut in a 2–1 win against Sagawa Printing, playing 80 minutes before being subbed off.

Kelantan FA
Malaysian media reported in early March 2014 that Wan Zack will join Kelantan FA in April.

FELDA United

After his contract with Kelantan is become to end, Wan Zack switch sides and joined FELDA United, signing a two-year contract on an undisclosed fee. He made his debut, playing 86-minutes on 21 January 2017 against PKNS in Super League matches, which FELDA United won by 1–0.

Selangor

After succeeded in helping FELDA United to become the 2018 Malaysia Premier League champions, Wan Zack signed a one-year contract, with the option for a second year, with Selangor. He will join the squad along with new coach B. Sathianathan, and other teammates K. Prabakaran, Azreen Zulkafali and Farizal Harun, who already joined Red Giants before him.

International career

2012 AFF Suzuki Cup
Wan Zack was called up for 2012 AFF Suzuki Cup. He played his first AFF Suzuki Cup match against Singapore after coming off the bench. Unfortunately, Malaysia loses 3–0 on home ground. Wan Zack played a big role in a match against Laos in which he provided a goal and an assist to help Malaysia win 4–1 on 28 November 2012 at the National Stadium, Bukit Jalil. Wan Zack showed excellent performance against Indonesia in the third match. He provided an assist to teammate Mahali Jasuli. Later, Wan Zack was injured in that match but Malaysia won 2–0 to progress to the semi-final. Wan Zack does not play on two semi-final match against Thailand due to injury. Malaysia failed to progress to final after losing 1–3 on aggregates.

Career statistics

Club

International

International goals
Scores and results list Malaysia's goal tally first.

Honours
Harimau Muda A
 Merdeka Tournament  : 2013
 Malaysia Premier League  : 2009
 International U-21 Football Tournament Thanh Nien Cup  : 2012

Kelantan FA
 Malaysia FA Cup: Runner-up 2015
Felda United
 Malaysia Super League Third place :2017 
 Malaysia Premier League : 2018
Individual
 FAM Best Young Players Awards: 2011
 Merdeka Tournament's Most Valuable Player: 2013
 S League Yeo's People's Choice Awards: 2012
 YEO's Young Player of the Year: 2012
Goal.com Asian Best XI: November 2012

See also
 Harimau Muda A
 Malaysia national under-23 football team

References

External links
 

1991 births
People from Pahang
Living people
Malaysian people of Malay descent
Malaysian footballers
Malaysia international footballers
Malaysian expatriate footballers
Malaysian expatriate sportspeople in Slovakia
Expatriate footballers in Slovakia
FC ViOn Zlaté Moravce players
Malaysian expatriate sportspeople in Japan
Expatriate footballers in Japan
FC Ryukyu players
J3 League players
Japan Football League players
Kelantan FA players
Felda United F.C. players
Perak F.C. players
Selangor FA players
Malaysia Super League players
Association football wingers
Singapore Premier League players